Raifatus is a village in Raihat district, Belu Regency in East Nusa Tenggara Province. Its population is 760.

Climate
Raifatus has a borderline subtropical highland climate (Cwb) and tropical savanna climate (Aw). The coldest month averages 17.9 °C, only 0.1 short of the threshold for tropical climates. It has moderate to little rainfall from May to October and heavy to very heavy rainfall from November to April.

References

East Nusa Tenggara
Villages in Indonesia